The 2019 LA Galaxy II season was the club's sixth season of existence.

Squad information 
At the end of the season.

Transfers

Transfers in

Transfers out

Competitions

Friendlies

USL Championship

Standings

Regular season 
The first match of 2019 season was announced on December 14, 2018. The full regular season schedule was released on December 19, 2018.

All times in Pacific Time Zone.

Playoffs

See also 
 2019 in American soccer
 2019 LA Galaxy season

References

External links 
 

LA Galaxy II seasons
LA Galaxy II
LA Galaxy II
LA Galaxy II